Benjamin Paul Mwanzia Nzimbi (born 1945 in Kitui District) is a Kenyan Anglican archbishop. He was the archbishop and primate of the Anglican Church of Kenya and Bishop of the Diocese of All Saints Cathedral, from 2002 to 2009. He is married to Alice Kavula and the couple has five children.

He was born in a poor family of eight children and went to attend Ithookwe Primary, Mulutu Intermediary and Kitui School. He later attended Kenyatta University, where he obtained a bachelor's degree in Education, with majors in Religion and Kishwahili. Afterward, he worked as a lecturer at Machakos Teachers Training College, where he was dean of students and head of social studies. He felt his religious call then and was trained and ordained as the college chaplain.

He finally decided to leave teaching to become a full-time priest. He studied for the priesthood at the Trinity and St. Francis College, in Karen in 1984. Afterwards, Nzimbi was elected as the first bishop of the new Diocese of Machakos, which he served from 1985 to 1995. In 1995 he was elected the first bishop of the newly created Diocese of Kitui. Nzimbi was elected the fourth archbishop and primate of Kenya and Bishop of the Diocese of All Saints Cathedral on 16 August 2002 and served from 2002 to 2009.

He opposed the acceptance on non-celibate gay clergy and the blessing of same-sex unions in the United States and Canada branches of the Anglican Communion, becoming a leading name in the Anglican realignment as member of the Global South and the Fellowship of Confessing Anglicans. He attended the GAFCON meeting in Jerusalem in 2008, and supported the creation of the Anglican Church in North America in June 2009. He was one of the Anglican Primates that attended the new church inaugural assembly in Bedford, Texas.

References

External links
A profile of Archbishop Benjamin Nzimbi, Anglican Mainstream, 9 November 2008

1945 births
Living people
Anglican archbishops of Kenya
Anglican bishops of Machakos
Anglican bishops of Kitui
Anglican bishops of All Saints' Cathedral
20th-century Anglican bishops of the Anglican Church of Kenya
21st-century Anglican bishops of the Anglican Church of Kenya
21st-century Anglican archbishops
Kamba people
People from Kitui County
Anglican realignment people